Iñapari is a Peruvian village capital of the Tahuamanu Province in the Madre de Dios Region, located on the triple border of Bolivia, Brazil and Peru. It is connected to Brazil by the Brazil-Peru Integration Bridge, an international bridge crossing the Acre River that was completed in 2006 as part of the Interoceanic Highway. Iñapari has a population of about 1,500 people. Iñapari has been experiencing a rapid demographic growth since the opening of the Interoceanic Highway that connects São Paulo, Brazil with Lima. Its economy is based on the commerce of handcraft. There is also some incipient trade of goods with Brazil.

References

Populated places in the Madre de Dios Region